Joseph Coëtnempren de Kersaint (29 November 1746 – Isle de France (Mauritius), 1797)  was a French Navy officer.

Biography 
Joseph Coëtnempren de Kersaint was born to the family of Guy François Coëtnempren de Kersaint, a French Navy officer. His two brothers, Armand de Kersaint (1742–1793) and Guy Pierre Kersaint (1747–1822), also served in the Navy.

Kersaint joined the Navy at a Garde-Marine on 25 July 1762. He was promoted to Ensign on 15 September 1771, and to Lieutenant on 5 February 1786.

He served on Heure du Berger from November 1767 to January 1769. 

In 1776, he served on the 40-gun frigate Consolante. In June 1778, he transferred to the 64-gun Brillant.

Kersaint married at Isle de France on 3 April 1780.

In June 1782, Kersaint, by then retired from the Navy, departed Brest, captaining the corvette Duc de Chartes. He arrived at Achem on 24 November.

Notes, citations, and references
Notes

Citations

References
 
 
 

French Navy officers